Timotheus is a masculine male name. It is a latinized version of the Greek name  (Timόtheos) mmeaning "one who honours God", from τιμή  "honour" and θεός "god". The English version Timothy (and its variations) is a common name in several countries.

People
Timotheus of Miletus, 5th century BC Greek poet and musician at the court of Archelaus I of Macedon
Timotheus (general) 4th century BC, Athenian statesman and general, son of the general Conon
Timotheus (sculptor), 4th century BC Greek sculptor who took part in the building of Mausoleum of Maussollos
Timotheus of Heraclea, 4th century BC ruler of Heraclea Pontica, and the son of the tyrant Clearchus of Heraclea
Timotheus (aulist), a late 4th century BC musician at the court of Alexander the Great
Timotheus (Ammon), a 2nd century BC Ammonite opponent of Judas Maccabeus
 Timotheus of Tralles, 2nd century BC, victor of the 163 Ancient Olympic Games at Stadion
Saint Timotheus, 1st century AD Christian leader
Timotheus of Gaza, 5th century AD Greek grammarian active during the reign of Anastasius
Pope Timotheus I of Alexandria, 4th century bishop
Pope Timotheus II of Alexandria, also known as Timotheus Aelurus, 5th century AD monophysite bishop
Timotheus Salophakiolos, known as Timotheus III, the Greek Orthodox patriarch of Alexandria from 460475 and again from 477 until his death in 485.
Timotheus IV of Alexandria, a bishop in the 6th century. Also known as Timothy III, since the Coptic Church does not recognize the third Timothy.
Daumantas of Pskov, also known as Timotheus of Pskov, 13th Century AD patron saint of the city of Pskov

Other uses
Léal Souvenir, a 1432 portrait by Jan van Eyck alternately known as Timotheus

See also
 Timothy (given name)
 Tim
 Timmy
 Timo
 Timothy (disambiguation)
 Tim (disambiguation)
 Timoti (disambiguation)

References

Given names of Greek language origin
Greek masculine given names
Masculine given names